Sveltella is a genus of sea snails, marine gastropod mollusks in the family Cancellariidae, the nutmeg snails.

Species
Species within the genus Sveltella include:

 Sveltella philippii Cossmann, 1899

References

Cancellariidae
Monotypic gastropod genera